Elaeodopsis is a genus of moths of the family Noctuidae.

Species
 Elaeodopsis girardi Laporte, 1972
 Elaeodopsis loxoscia Prout, 1927
 Elaeodopsis rougeoti (Laporte, 1970)
 Elaeodopsis turlini Laporte, 1978

References
Natural History Museum Lepidoptera genus database
Elaeodopsis at funet

Hadeninae